Der Todestunnel, known in Italian as 1200º: La Verità della Tunnel della Morte is a joint production television movie filmed in Austria and Italy, and has both Austrian and Italian actors speaking in their native languages.

Plot
The film opens up as a young prosecutor is handed her toughest assignment: a truck driver charged with reckless driving. She has to prove that he was negligent and kept falling asleep at the wheel. After crashing his semi into a sports car, his rig turns over, gas leaks out, and a fire ensues, shutting down the lights in the long tunnel. Unfortunately, due to the length of the tunnel it is impossible for rescue personnel to get in the tunnel to give adequate medical attention to the people seriously injured. There are several flashbacks, where survivors recall the accident, including a grieving father named Giuseppe Paoletti, portrayed by Flavio Insinna, an Italian family man who is driving his wife and son to Austria, who emotionally describes his account of what happened after the accident.

Two versions
There are two different versions of the film. Der Todestunnel, the original title, is filmed in German with the Italian actors' voices dubbed, and in the Italian version, 1200º: La Verità della Tunnel della morte the opposite is true.

Background
The movie is based on a true story about a catastrophic accident, which takes place inside the tunnel connecting Austria and Italy. As a result, at least 50 people died of smoke inhalation.

External links

2005 films
2005 television films
Austrian television films
Italian television films
2000s German-language films
German-language television shows
2000s Italian-language films